Brian Bowe (born 15 March 1936) is a former Australian rules footballer who played with St Kilda in the Victorian Football League (VFL).

Biography 
Brian Bowe was born 15 March 1936. He would play 90-100 games for Kyneton in Victoria's Bendigo League from 1952 to 1957. He joined St. Kilda, and played 17 games for them from 1958 to 1959. Including three finals games in Lake Oval in the 1958 VFL Consolation Night series. His team defeated Carlton in the grand final, 16.13 (109) – 15.11 (101). Afterwards, he returned to Kyneton in 1960 where he joined the premiership team and played 11 games. In early January 1961, Ern Wadham, a NFC secretary helped him join Norwood. He would play 74 games for Norwood, from 1961 to 1965, including the losing 1961 grand final to West Adelaide.

Notes

External links 

Living people
1936 births
Australian rules footballers from Victoria (Australia)
St Kilda Football Club players
Kyneton Football Club players